Eng. Nicolas Gumbo WAJONYA is a Kenyan politician. He was the Member of Parliament (MP) for Rarieda Constituency from 2007 to 2017 where he broke the one term jinx and remains the only Rarieda member of parliament to do so. He served as Chairman Public Accounts Committee, Member House Broadcasting committee, Member Constituencies Fund committee and Member of Energy committee. He also served as Kenyatta National Hospital board chairman.  .

Education
Gumbo attended Atemo Primary from 1972 to 1973, Lwak Mixed Primary School from 1974 to 1975, Orengo Primary School from 1975 to 1976 and Opapo Primary School in Kamagambo from 1977 to 1978. After earning the highest marks in CPE in the then Bondo District, he pursued his secondary education in Cardinal Otunga High School, Kisii from 1979 to 1984. He holds a first class honors in Bachelor of Science Degree (BSc) in Electrical and Electronics Engineering from The University of Nairobi class of 1989 and a Master’s in Business Administration (MBA) in Management Information Systems (MIS) from The University of Nairobi.

Career
Gumbo joined Carl Bro International in 1989 as a graduate engineer where he was later promoted to an electrical design engineer until 1994 where he resigned to begin his career as a consulting engineer. Through this role he specialized in the design of electrical installations and energy audits for industrial, petroleum handling facilities, office buildings, hospitals, education institutions, banks, warehouses, factories and several other facilities.

He is also an active member of various professional societies in his field.
Fellow, Institution of Engineers of Kenya. 
Engineers Board of Kenya-Registered Consulting Engineer.
Professional Engineer (PE)- Engineers Board of Kenya.
Member, Institution of Engineers of Kenya.
Member of the Association of Consulting Engineers of Kenya.
Corporate Member, Architectural Association of Kenya and
member of the Institution of Engineering and Technology.

Political Life

In 2015, in his capacity as chairman of the parliamentary Public Accounts Committee (PAC), Gumbo was at the forefront of questioning cabinet secretary Anne Waiguru over corruption allegations in the ministry of devolution and planning in the National Youth Service Scandal.

In 2015 before tabling the forensic report on the judiciary, Gumbo told the media that he had received death threats from unknown sources. He said that he got text messages saying that the death threats were aimed at him and his family.

In 2015, he said that he would run for the Siaya gubernatorial seat in 2017 to unseat the incumbent Cornel Rasanga.

References

1965 births
Living people
University of Nairobi alumni
Orange Democratic Movement politicians
Members of the National Assembly (Kenya)